Fran Lew is an American master portrait artist (born 1946). She is a contemporary realist, trained in academic classical realism. Lew's style of portraiture combines traditional techniques of the Old Masters with her own contemporary vision.

Biography

Lew comes from a family of artists. She began drawing at her father's side at the age of three. Her formal studies earned her an MFA degree from Boston University. She did her postgraduate work in Venice, Italy at the Palazzo Grassi International Center for Painting and Design. In New York City, she studied at the Art Students League with masters Daniel Greene, Robert Beverly Hale and John Howard Sanden.

Lew later moved to White Plains, New York, where she studied under the mentorship of the late Cesare Borgia. Borgia was himself a student of Frank Reilly. Lew herself has been influenced by the Reilly principles of painting. This influence is evident at all of her exhibits, among which were portraits and figures at the Columbus Club and Grand Central Art Galleries in New York City.

Lew was represented by the Grand Central Art Galleries, which closed in 1994. Many of the Grand Central Art Galleries records are archived at the Smithsonian Institution.

Museum and other collections 
Among other places, her work can be found at the Federal Reserve Board of Governors, Washington, D.C.; Cornell Museum of Art & American Culture, Delray Beach Florida; Sherwin Miller Museum, Tulsa Oklahoma; Maitland Art Center, Maitland, Florida; State of Israel Collection, Tel Aviv, Israel; and the Brooklyn Historical Society, Brooklyn New York, Chuck Jones Gallery Costa Mesa California.

Awards 
 Gold Medal, Knickerbocker Artists, 1984
 Thora M. Jensen Portrait Award, Hudson Valley Art Assn., 1985
 Sharon Ortlip Memorial Award, Salmagundi Club, 1985
 Anna Hyatt Huntington Bronze Medal, First Place Graphic, Catherine Lorillard Wolfe Art Club, 1986
 Crescent Cardboard Company, Corporate Prize, American Artist Magazine Golden Anniversary National Competition, 1987
 Solo Award-Best Show, Pen & Brush Club Oil Exhibit, 1987
 Margaret Dole Portrait Award, Catherine Lorillard Wolfe Art Club, 1988

References

Chuck Jones Gallery, feature article "Artist Fran Lew Honored, Johnny now part of Federal Reserve Board Art Collection November 2017.

"Cesare Borgia Art". Cesare Borgia Art. Retrieved April 3, 2016.

"OCLC Classify -- an Experimental Classification Service". classify.oclc.org. Retrieved 2016-04-03.

Chuck Jones Gallery, feature article "It's the Real Thing", 2014;

"New York Artist Gives Fenster Museum Portrait of Golda Meir". Tulsa World. Retrieved 2016-04-04.

Who's Who in American Women; Who's Who in American Art;

Quoted, New York Times, July 16, 1995

Quoted, New York Post, 1995;

Quoted, New York Daily News February 24, 1995;

Quoted, Gannet Newspapers Georgette Gouveau (author) 1995;

Quoted, American Artist Magazine, June 1993;

Oggi Magazine, April 1990;

Manhattan Arts, October 1989;

Drawings in the Golden Anniversary National Art Competition, American Artist Magazine, June 1987;

Westchester Spotlight Magazine August 1986 page 98, Edward Rubin (author);

New York Daily News, May 1986;

Northlight Magazine, feature article, Member of The Issue, summer 1982;

"The News - Google News Archive Search". news.google.com. Retrieved 2016-04-04.

External links 
 Fran Lew's official website

1946 births
Living people
American portrait painters
Boston University alumni